Gomphidius smithii is an edible mushroom in the family Gomphidiaceae that is found in the Pacific Northwest in North America.

References

External links

Boletales
Edible fungi
Fungi described in 1948
Fungi of North America